ARA General Belgrano (C-4) was an Argentine Navy light cruiser in service from 1951 until 1982. The vessel was the second to have been named after the Argentine founding father Manuel Belgrano (1770–1820). The first vessel was a 7,069-ton armoured cruiser completed in 1896.

She was sunk on 2 May 1982 during the Falklands War by the Royal Navy submarine  with the loss of 323 lives. Losses from General Belgrano totalled just under half of Argentine military deaths in the war.

She is the only ship to have been sunk during military operations by a nuclear-powered submarine and the second sunk in action by any type of submarine since World War II (the first being the Indian frigate , which was sunk by the Pakistani submarine  during the 1971 Indo-Pakistani War).

Early career

She survived the Japanese attack on Pearl Harbor in 1941 undamaged, and went on to earn nine battle stars for World War II service. At the end of the war, she was placed in reserve at Philadelphia on 28 February 1946, decommissioned on 3 July that year and remained laid up at Philadelphia.

Phoenix was sold to Argentina in October 1951 and renamed 17 de Octubre after the  "People's Loyalty day", an important symbol for the political party of the then-president Juan Perón.

17 de Octubre was one of the main naval units that joined the 1955 coup in which Perón was overthrown, and was renamed General Belgrano after Manuel Belgrano, a lawyer who had founded the Escuela de Náutica (School of Navigation) in 1799 and with the rank of general fought for Argentine independence from 1811 to 1819. General Belgrano accidentally rammed her sister ship Nueve de Julio on exercises in 1956, which resulted in damage to both. General Belgrano was outfitted with the Sea Cat anti-aircraft missile system between 1967 and 1968.

Sinking

On 12 April 1982, following the 1982 invasion of the Falkland Islands, Britain declared a  Maritime Exclusion Zone (MEZ) around the Falkland Islands within which any Argentine warship or naval auxiliary entering the MEZ might be attacked by British nuclear-powered submarines (SSN). On 23 April, the British Government clarified in a message that was passed via the Swiss Embassy in Buenos Aires to the Argentine government that any Argentine ship or aircraft that was considered to pose a threat to British forces would be attacked.

On 30 April this was upgraded to the total exclusion zone, within which any sea vessel or aircraft from any country entering the zone might be fired upon without further warning. The zone was stated to be "...without prejudice to the right of the United Kingdom to take whatever additional measures may be needed in exercise of its right of self-defence, under Article 51 of the United Nations Charter." The concept of a total exclusion zone was a novelty in maritime law; the Law of the Sea Convention had no provision for such an instrument. Its purpose seems to have been to increase the amount of time available to ascertain whether any vessel in the zone was hostile or not. Regardless of the uncertainty of the zone's legal status, it was widely respected by the shipping of neutral nations.

The Argentine military junta began to reinforce the islands in late April when it was realised that the British Task Force was heading south. As part of these movements, Argentine naval units were ordered to take positions around the islands. Two Task Groups designated 79.1, which included the aircraft carrier ARA Veinticinco de Mayo plus two Type 42 destroyers, and 79.2, which included three Exocet missile armed Drummond-class corvettes, both sailed to the north. General Belgrano had left Ushuaia in Tierra del Fuego on 26 April. Two destroyers, ARA Piedra Buena and ARA Hipólito Bouchard (also ex-USN vessels) were detached from Task Group 79.2 and together with the tanker YPF Puerto Rosales, joined General Belgrano to form Task Group 79.3.

By 29 April, the ships were patrolling the Burdwood Bank, south of the islands. On 30 April, General Belgrano was detected by the British nuclear-powered hunter-killer submarine . The submarine approached over the following day. On 1 May 1982, Admiral Juan Lombardo ordered all Argentine naval units to seek out the British task force around the Falklands and launch a "massive attack" the following day. General Belgrano, which was outside and to the south-west of the exclusion zone, was ordered south-east.

Lombardo's signal was intercepted by British Intelligence. As a result, Prime Minister Margaret Thatcher and her War Cabinet, meeting at Chequers the following day, agreed to a request from Admiral Terence Lewin, the Chief of the Defence Staff, to alter the rules of engagement and allow an attack on General Belgrano outside the exclusion zone. Although the group was outside the British-declared total exclusion zone of 370 km (200 nautical miles) radius from the islands, the British decided that it was a threat. After consultation at Cabinet level, Thatcher agreed that Commander Chris Wreford-Brown should attack General Belgrano.

At 14:57 (Falkland Islands Time) on 2 May, Conqueror fired three 21-inch Mk 8 mod 4 torpedoes (conventional, non-guided, torpedoes), each with an 805-pound (363 kg) Torpex warhead. While Conqueror was also equipped with the newer Mark 24 Tigerfish homing torpedo, there were doubts about its reliability. Initial reports from Argentina claimed that Conqueror fired two Tigerfish torpedoes on General Belgrano. Two of the three torpedoes hit General Belgrano.

One of the torpedoes struck  aft of the bow, outside the area protected by either the ship's side armour or the internal anti-torpedo bulge. This blew off the ship's bow, but the internal torpedo bulkheads held and the forward powder magazine for the 40 mm gun did not detonate. It is believed that none of the ship's company were in that part of the ship at the time of the explosion.

The second torpedo struck about three-quarters of the way along the ship, just outside the rear limit of the side armour plating. The torpedo punched through the side of the ship before exploding in the aft machine room. The explosion tore upward through two messes and a relaxation area called "the Soda Fountain" before finally ripping a  hole in the main deck. Later reports put the number of deaths in the area around the explosion at 275 men. After the explosion, the ship rapidly filled with smoke. The explosion also damaged  General Belgrano electrical power system, preventing her from putting out a radio distress call. Though the forward bulkheads held, water was rushing in through the hole created by the second torpedo and could not be pumped out because of the electrical power failure. In addition, although the ship should have been "at action stations", she was sailing with the water-tight doors open.

The ship began to list to port and to sink towards the bow. Twenty minutes after the attack, at 16:24, Captain Bonzo ordered the crew to abandon ship. Inflatable life rafts were deployed, and the evacuation began without panic.

The two escort ships were unaware of what was happening to General Belgrano, as they were out of touch with her in the gloom and had not seen the distress rockets or lamp signals. Adding to the confusion, the crew of Bouchard felt an impact that was possibly the third torpedo striking at the end of its run (an examination of the ship later showed an impact mark consistent with a torpedo). The two ships continued on their course westward. By the time the ships realised that something had happened to General Belgrano, it was already dark and the weather had worsened, scattering the life rafts.

Argentine and Chilean ships rescued 772 men from 3 to 5 May. In total, 323 were killed in the attack: 321 members of the crew and two civilians who were on board at the time.

Naval outcome
Following the loss of General Belgrano, the Argentine fleet returned to its bases and played no major role in the rest of the conflict. British nuclear submarines continued to operate in the sea areas between Argentina and the Falkland Islands, gathering intelligence, providing early warning of air raids and effectively imposing sea denial. A further effect was that the Argentinian Navy's carrier-borne aircraft had to operate from land bases at the limit of their range, rather than from an aircraft carrier at sea. The minimal role of the Navy in the rest of the campaign led to a considerable loss of credibility and influence within the Junta.

Controversy over the sinking
The legality of the sinking of General Belgrano has been disputed due to disagreement on the exact nature of the Maritime Exclusion Zone (MEZ) and whether General Belgrano had been returning to port at the time of the sinking. Through a message passed via the Swiss Embassy in Buenos Aires to the Argentine government nine days before the sinking, the UK made clear that it no longer considered the 200 mile exclusion zone as the limit of its military action. On 1 May 1982, Admiral Juan Lombardo ordered all Argentine naval units to seek out the British task force around the Falklands and launch a "massive attack" the following day.

In 2003, the ship's captain Hector Bonzo confirmed that General Belgrano had actually been manoeuvering, not "sailing away" from the exclusion zone. Captain Bonzo stated that any suggestion that HMS Conqueror actions were a "betrayal" was utterly wrong; rather, the submarine carried out its duties according to the accepted rules of war. In an interview two years before his death in 2009, he further stated that: "It was absolutely not a war crime. It was an act of war, lamentably legal."

The sinking also became a cause célèbre for anti-war campaigners such as Labour MP Tam Dalyell. Early reports suggested that more than 1,000 Argentine sailors might have been killed in the sinking; it was in fact around a third of that number.

The sinking occurred 14 hours after President of Peru Fernando Belaúnde proposed a comprehensive peace plan and called for regional unity, although Prime Minister Margaret Thatcher and diplomats in London did not see this document until after the sinking of General Belgrano. Diplomatic efforts to that point had failed completely.  After the sinking, Argentina rejected the plan but the UK indicated its acceptance on 5 May. The news was subsequently dominated by military action and the British continued to offer ceasefire terms until 1 June that were rejected by the Junta.

Argentine response

On 3 May 1982, Argentina's Chancellery released a statement in the name of the Argentinian government that read:

Legal situation

Neither the United Kingdom nor Argentina declared war during the conflict. Combat was confined to the area around and on the Falkland Islands and South Georgia. General Belgrano was sunk outside the  total exclusion zone around the Falklands, delimited by the UK. Through a message passed via the Swiss Embassy in Buenos Aires to the Argentine government on 23 April, the UK made clear that it no longer considered the 200-mile (370 km) exclusion zone as the limit of its military action. The message read:

Interviews conducted by Martin Middlebrook for his book Argentine Fight for the Falklands indicated that Argentine naval officers understood that the intent of the message was to indicate that any ships operating near the exclusion zone could be attacked. Argentine Rear Admiral Allara, who was in charge of the task force of which General Belgrano was part, said: "After that message of 23 April, the entire South Atlantic was an operational theatre for both sides. We, as professionals, said it was just too bad that we lost the Belgrano". Captain Bonzo also told Middlebrook that he was not angry about the attack on his ship and that "The limit [exclusion zone] did not exclude danger or risks; it was all the same in or out. I would like to be quite precise that, as far as I was concerned, the 200-mile limit was valid until 1 May, that is while diplomatic negotiations were taking place and/or until a real act of war took place, and that had happened on 1 May".

Admiral Sandy Woodward, who commanded the British task force during the war, wrote in his 1997 book One Hundred Days that HMS Conqueror received a signal changing the rules of engagement and that "The change said quite clearly he may now attack the Belgrano, outside the TEZ".

Later political controversy
Some details of the action were leaked to a British Member of Parliament, Tam Dalyell, in 1985 by the senior civil servant Clive Ponting, resulting in the unsuccessful prosecution of the latter under the Official Secrets Act 1911. The documents revealed that  General Belgrano was sailing away from the exclusion zone when she was attacked and sunk.

In May 1983, Thatcher appeared on Nationwide, a live television show on BBC1, where a teacher, Diana Gould, questioned her about the sinking, saying that the ship was already west of the Falklands and heading towards the Argentine mainland to the west. Gould also said that the Peruvian peace proposal must have reached London in the 14 hours between its publication and the sinking of General Belgrano, and the escalation of the war could have thus been prevented. In the emotional exchange that followed, Thatcher answered that the vessel was a threat to British ships and lives and denied that the peace proposal had reached her. She added that "One day, all of the facts, in about 30 years time, will be published", apparently a reference to a classified report prepared by intelligence officer Major David Thorp for Thatcher after the incident. Diana Gould died in December 2011, just a few weeks before the existence of the report was made public.

After the show, Thatcher's husband Denis lashed out at the producer of the show in the entertainment suite, saying that his wife had been "stitched up by bloody BBC poofs and Trots". Thatcher herself commented during the interview:  "I think it could only be in Britain that a prime minister was accused of sinking an enemy ship that was a danger to our navy, when my main motive was to protect the boys in our navy."

According to the British historian Sir Lawrence Freedman, neither Thatcher nor the Cabinet was aware of General Belgrano change of course before the cruiser was attacked. In his book One Hundred Days, Admiral Woodward claims that General Belgrano was part of the southern part of a pincer movement aimed at the task force, and had to be sunk quickly. He wrote:

"Gotcha" headline

On 4 May, the British tabloid newspaper The Sun ran the controversial headline "Gotcha" in reference to the sinking of General Belgrano. Kelvin MacKenzie, the newspaper's editor, was reported to have used an impromptu exclamation by The Sun features editor, Wendy Henry, as the inspiration for the headline. The accompanying text reported that General Belgrano had only been hit and damaged and not sunk, while a "gunboat" (actually the armed tug ARA Alférez Sobral) had sunk, when in fact the reverse was the case.  After early editions went to press, further reports suggested a major loss of life, and Mackenzie toned down the headline to read "Did 1,200 Argies drown?" in later editions.

Despite its notoriety, few readers in the UK saw the headline at first hand as it was only used on copies of the first northern editions; southern editions and later editions in the North carried the toned-down headline.

Aftermath

In August 1994, an official Argentine Defence Ministry report written by armed forces auditor Eugenio Miari was released which described the sinking of General Belgrano as "a legal act of war", explaining that "acts of war can be carried out in all of the enemy's territory" and "they can also take place in those areas over which no state can claim sovereignty, in international waters". Argentinian veterans were said to be dismayed at the conclusion about General Belgrano and the President of the Federation of Argentine War Veterans Luis Ibáñez hoped to produce more witnesses to show that the sinking was a war crime.

In 1999 Sir Michael Boyce, First Sea Lord of the Royal Navy, visited the Puerto Belgrano naval base and paid tribute to those who died. In 2003 a search team aboard Seacor Lenga, crewed by Argentine and British veterans, was sponsored by National Geographic to find the sunken cruiser but failed to locate the ship. The area where General Belgrano sank, that was not found, is classified as a War Grave under Argentine Congress Law 25.546.

In 2000, lawyers representing the families of the sailors killed onboard General Belgrano attempted to sue the British Government in the European Court of Human Rights on the grounds that the attack took place outside the exclusion zone. It was an attempt to pressure the Argentine government to lodge an action against the UK in the International Court of Justice, but was ruled inadmissible by the Court of Human Rights on the grounds that it had been submitted too late.

La Nación published a reader's letter from Admiral  (head of the Argentine Navy in the 1990s) in 2005 in which Molina Pico wrote that General Belgrano was part of an operation that posed a real threat to the British task force, but was holding off for tactical reasons. Molina Pico added that "To leave the exclusion zone was not to leave the combat zone to enter a protected area". Molina Pico explicitly stated that the sinking was not a war crime, but a combat action.

General Belgranos captain, Héctor Bonzo, died on 22 April 2009, aged 76. He had spent his last years working for an association called Amigos del Crucero General Belgrano (Friends of the Cruiser General Belgrano) whose purpose was to help those affected by the sinking. Captain Bonzo also wrote his memories about the sinking in the book 1093 Tripulantes del Crucero ARA General Belgrano, published in 1992. In this book he wrote that it is "improper to accept that (...) the attack by HMS Conqueror was a betrayal". During an interview in 2003 he had stated that General Belgrano was only temporarily sailing to the west at the time of the attack, and his orders were to attack any British ships which came within range of the cruiser's armament.

In late 2011, Major David Thorp, a former British military intelligence officer who led the signals intercept team aboard , released the book The Silent Listener detailing the role of intelligence in the Falklands War. In the book he stated that despite the fact that General Belgrano was observed by Conqueror sailing away from the Falklands at the time of the attack, she had actually been ordered to proceed to a rendezvous point within the Exclusion Zone. A report prepared by Thorp for Thatcher several months after the incident stated the destination of the vessel was not to her home port as the Argentine Junta stated; the report was not released because the Prime Minister did not want to compromise British signals intelligence capabilities.

In 2012 the President of Argentina, Cristina Fernández de Kirchner, referred to the sinking of General Belgrano as a "war crime". However, the Argentine Navy has held the view that the sinking was a legitimate act of war, a position that was asserted by the Argentine Navy before various courts in 1995, and by the vessel's Captain Hector Bonzo in 2003.

See also 

 List of cruisers
 List of ships of the Argentine Navy
 List of ships sunk by submarines by death toll

Notes

References

Sources

 
 
 
 
 
 
 
 
 
 
 , originally published as

External links

 Asociación Amigos del Crucero General Belgrano. Accessed 2011-01-08.
 Vice Admiral Sir Tim McClement Interview "Why we sank the Belgrano" on BBC radio 4

1938 ships
Brooklyn-class cruisers of the Argentine Navy
Cold War cruisers of Argentina
Falklands War naval ships of Argentina
Maritime incidents in 1956
Maritime incidents in 1982
Maritime incidents in Argentina
Ships built by New York Shipbuilding Corporation
Ships present during the attack on Pearl Harbor
Ships sunk by British submarines
Shipwrecks of Argentina
Shipwrecks of the Falklands War
Shipwrecks of the Argentine coast